Deh-e Nab Khush (also Romanized as Deh-e Nāb Khūsh) is a village in Gavkan Rural District, in the Central District of Rigan County, Kerman Province, Iran. At the 2006 census, its population was 26, in 6 families.

References 

Populated places in Rigan County